iki is Värttinä's 11th album (9th studio album), released in 2003. It continues Värttinä's trend of having more original compositions,  while retaining a folk influence in the songs and their style.

iki was released on February 28, 2003 by BMG Finland in Finland, to coincide with Värttinä's 20th anniversary concert in Helsinki. Later in the spring of 2003, it was released by Frea in Benelux, Resistencia in Spain, Westpark Music in Germany, NorthSide in the United States, Koruna Music in Japan, and in the United Kingdom and France.

In Songlines' July/August 2003 issue, iki was the 24th selection on their "50 World Music Albums You Must Own".

Track listing
"Syyllinen Syli (osa 1)" / "Faithless Arms (part 1)" (music: Anto Varilo; lyrics: Mari Kaasinen, traditional) – 1:30
"Tuulen Tunto" / "To Feel the Wind" (Janne Lappalainen; M. Kaasinen, Johanna Virtanen, trad.) – 5:00
"Sepän Poika" / "The Blacksmith's Son" (Varilo; Kiiskinen) – 3:19
"Tauti" / "Disease" (Varilo; M. Kaasinen, trad.) – 4:04
"Morsian" / "The Bride" (Varilo; M. Kaasinen, trad.) – 4:45
"Nahkaruoska" / "Leather Whip" (M. Kaasinen; M. Kaasinen, Virtanen, trad.) – 3:08
"Maahinen Neito" / "Earth-maiden" (Susan Aho; Kiiskinen) – 4:23
"Potran Korean" / "A Sturdy Handsome Lad" (Aho; Kiiskinen) – 2:33
"Vihi" (Varilo; no lyrics) – 3:31
"Hopeat" / "Silver" (Lappalainen; M. Kaasinen) – 5:36
"Tumma" / "Dark" (Lappalainen; M. Kaasinen) – 4:30
"Syyllinen Syli (osa 2)" / "Faithless Arms (part 2)" (Varilo; M. Kaasinen, trad.) – 4:13

Personnel
Mari Kaasinen – vocals
Susan Aho – vocals
Johanna Virtanen – vocals
Antto Varilo – 6 & 12 string guitars, saz, dobro, fado guitar, kantele, bass kantele, organ
Janne Lappalainen – bouzouki, saxophone, cava, low whistle
Lassi Logren – fiddle, octave fiddle, jouhikko, nyckelharpa, vocals
Markku Lepistö – accordion
Hannu Rantanen – double bass
Jaska Lukkarinen – drums, percussion

References

External links
Värttinä page with lyrics, English translations and samples 

Värttinä albums
2003 albums